North Antrim was a constituency of the Northern Ireland House of Commons.

The House of Commons (Method of Voting and Redistribution of Seats) Act (Northern Ireland), 1929 introduced first-past-the-post elections for 48 single-member constituencies (including Antrim North).

This constituency was one of seven county divisions in Antrim, so it was smaller than the UK Parliament seat. From 1969 there were nine county divisions in Antrim, but the changes in the vicinity of Belfast did not affect the boundaries of this division.

It comprised (in terms of local government units existing in 1929) parts of the rural districts of Ballycastle and Ballymoney together with the whole of the urban districts of Ballycastle, Ballymoney and Portrush.

It returned one member of Parliament from 1929 until the Parliament of Northern Ireland was temporarily suspended in 1972, and then formally abolished in 1973.

Politics
County Antrim (except for parts of Belfast) is a strongly unionist area. There has never been the slightest chance of a republican or nationalist candidate being elected in a single-member Antrim county constituency, however the boundaries were drawn. Antrim North has not been an exception.

At the Northern Ireland general election of 1929 the new Antrim North division was the scene of a reasonably close Unionist/Liberal contest (less than a 20% majority). However this was the last appearance of a Liberal candidate for the Northern Ireland Parliament constituency, which became an extremely safe Unionist seat for the rest of its existence.

Members of Parliament

Elections

The elections in this constituency took place using the first past the post electoral system.

 Death of Lynn

 Seat vacant on dissolution (death of McCleery)

 Parliament prorogued 30 March 1972 and abolished 18 July 1973

References
 Northern Ireland Parliamentary Election Results 1921-1972, compiled and edited by Sydney Elliott (Political Reference Publications 1973)

External links
 http://www.oireachtas.ie/members-hist/default.asp?housetype=0
 http://historical-debates.oireachtas.ie/en.toc.dail.html
 For more information about the Northern Ireland House of Commons see http://www.election.demon.co.uk/stormont/stormont.html 

Northern Ireland Parliament constituencies established in 1929
Constituencies of the Northern Ireland Parliament
Historic constituencies in County Antrim
Northern Ireland Parliament constituencies disestablished in 1973